Kpone Thermal Power Station II, also Kpone Independent Thermal Power Station, is a  multi-fuel-fired thermal power station under construction in Ghana.

Location

Overview
The power station is owned by CenPower Holdings, an independent power producing company comprising local Ghanaian shareholders, African Finance Corporation (46%) and InfraCo Limited (24%). Group Five Power Projects was awarded the EPC contract to design, procure, construct and commission the power plant. WorleyParsons, an International firm that specializes in engineering, procurement and construction was hired by Group Five to carry out the design functions. Sea water, accessed through underground pipes will be used to cool the power station, with the hot water effluent being returned to the sea through similar underground pipes. The power generated by this station will be sold directly to Electricity Company of Ghana (ECG), for integration into the Ghanaian national electricity grid.

Funding and timetable
It is expected that the cost of construction is approximately US$900 million, borrowed from the Africa Finance Corporation (AFC). Other funders and equity partners include Sumitomo Corporation and FMO. Construction began in 2015 and the plant began commercial operation in 2019.

See also 

Electricity sector in Ghana
List of power stations in Ghana

References

External links
Ghana: The Best Mix of Power Sources - the Way Forward for Ghana

Oil-fired power stations in Ghana
Natural gas-fired power stations in Ghana
Eastern Region (Ghana)